The Royal Scandal is a Sherlock Holmes film which is an amalgam of "A Scandal in Bohemia" and "The Bruce-Partington Plans". The film was produced in 2001 for The Hallmark Channel as part of an ongoing series of Hallmark Sherlock Holmes films.

Production

The third of four Holmes adaptations starring Frewer as Holmes, was preceded by The Hound of the Baskervilles in 2000 and The Sign of Four in 2001, and followed by The Case of the Whitechapel Vampire (an original story) in 2002.

Cast
 Matt Frewer - Sherlock Holmes
 Kenneth Welsh - Dr. Watson
 Liliana Komorowska - Irene Adler
 Daniel Brochu - Wiggins
 Seann Gallagher - Meisener
 R.H. Thomson - Mycroft Holmes
 Robin Wilcock - Crown Prince
 Alain Goulem - PC Trevor
 Jacob Richmond - Cadogan West
 Kathleen McAuliffe - Mrs. Hudson

References

External links 

The Sherlock Holmes Collection (2000-2002) - DVD Review
The Sherlock Holmes Collection

2001 television films
2001 films
Sherlock Holmes films based on works by Arthur Conan Doyle
Films directed by Rodney Gibbons